The 2002–03 season in Dutch football was the 47th season in the Eredivisie, where PSV claimed the title and Utrecht won the Dutch National Cup after defeating Feyenoord in the final.

Johan Cruijff-schaal

Eredivisie

Champions League : PSV
Champions League qualification : Ajax
UEFA Cup : Feyenoord, NAC Breda, NEC and Utrecht
Promotion / relegation play-offs ("Nacompetitie") : Zwolle and Excelsior
Relegated : De Graafschap

Top scorers

Awards

Dutch Footballer of the Year
 2002–03 — Mateja Kežman (PSV)

Dutch Golden Shoe Winner
 2002 — Cristian Chivu (Ajax)
 2003 — Dirk Kuyt (Utrecht)

PSV winning squad 2002–03

Goal
 Frank Kooiman
 Yves Lenaerts
 Jelle ten Rouwelaar
 Ronald Waterreus

Defence
 Eric Addo
 Kasper Bøgelund
 Wilfred Bouma
 Robert van Boxel
 Jürgen Dirkx
 Ernest Faber
 Jan Heintze
 Léon Hese
 Kevin Hofland

 Michael Lamey
 Lee Young-pyo
 André Ooijer
 Lindsay Wilson

Midfield
 Mark van Bommel
 Giorgi Gakhokidze
 John de Jong
 Leandro
 Theo Lucius
 Marquinho
 Park Ji-sung
 Adil Ramzi

 Dennis Rommedahl
 Remco van der Schaaf
 Johann Vogel

Attack
 Arnold Bruggink
 Arjen Robben
 Claudio
 Klaas-Jan Huntelaar
 Mateja Kežman
 Jan Vennegoor of Hesselink

Management
 Guus Hiddink (Coach)
 Erwin Koeman (Assistant)
 Fred Rutten (Assistant)

Eerste Divisie

Promoted : ADO Den Haag
Promotion / Relegation play-offs ("Nacompetitie") : Emmen, Heracles, Den Bosch, Volendam and Go Ahead Eagles

Top scorers

Promotion and relegation

Group A

Group B

Stayed : Zwolle
Promoted : Volendam
Relegated : Excelsior

KNVB Cup

Dutch national team

See also
Sparta Rotterdam season 2002–03

References
 RSSSF Archive
 Voetbalstats